The 2020 Nur-Sultan Challenger was a professional tennis tournament played on indoor hard courts. It was the second edition of the tournament which was part of the 2020 ATP Challenger Tour. It took place in Nur-Sultan, Kazakhstan between 9 and 15 March 2020. The completion of the tournament was canceled due to the coronavirus pandemic.

Singles main-draw entrants

Seeds

 1 Rankings are as of 2 March 2020.

Other entrants
The following players received wildcards into the singles main draw:
  Timur Khabibulin
  Timur Maulenov
  Danil Ozernoy
  Dostanbek Tashbulatov
  Bekzat Usipbekov

The following players received entry into the singles main draw as alternates:
  Aliaksandr Bulitski
  Mikhail Elgin
  Simon Freund
  Rostislav Galfinger
  Anatoliy Petrenko
  Szymon Walków
  Nenad Zimonjić

Champions

Singles

tournament canceled

Doubles

tournament canceled

References

2020 ATP Challenger Tour
2020 in Kazakhstani sport
March 2020 sports events in Kazakhstan
Sports events curtailed due to the COVID-19 pandemic